Mike Sandusky  (born March 13, 1935) is a former All Pro guard who played nine seasons in the National Football League (NFL). He was selected by the San Francisco 49ers in the 1957 NFL Draft. Sandusky attended the University of Maryland. Sandusky played high school football at Bound Brook High School in Bound Brook, New Jersey. He is the only alumni of Bound Brook to play in the NFL, as of 2014.

Michael Sandusky went on to become the head football coach at Sayreville War Memorial High School.

References

External links
 Mike Sandusky's Stats at pro-football-reference.com

1935 births
Living people
American football offensive guards
Maryland Terrapins football players
Pittsburgh Steelers players
Eastern Conference Pro Bowl players
People from Bound Brook, New Jersey
Players of American football from Newark, New Jersey
Bound Brook High School alumni